Sukhoy Ruchey is a rural locality (a selo) in Bichursky District, Republic of Buryatia, Russia. The population was 325 as of 2010. There are 3 streets.

Geography 
Sukhoy Ruchey is located 18 km southwest of Bichura (the district's administrative centre) by road. Dunda-Kiret is the nearest rural locality.

References 

Rural localities in Bichursky District